Ashina Xichun, also known as Chuluo Khagan (Turkic: Çula Han, Middle Chinese: (Guangyun) , died 620), was the khagan of the Eastern Turkic Khaganate, and second son of Yami Qaghan. He succeeded his elder brother Shibi and ruled for 18 months.

Reign 
Since Ashina Shibobi was still a minor, Ilteber shad succeeded his elder brother as khagan, also creating him Nipu shad and appointing eastern territories to him. He terminated the campaign started by his brother after receiving a large tribute from Tang.

Nevertheless, he created Yang Zhengdao, a posthumous son of Yang Jian, as puppet King of Sui (隋國王). Starting to plan a major assault as advised by Liang Shidu, he became allied to Wang Shichong and Dou Jiande. As part of the plan, he requested Dou to cross the Taihang Mountains and meet him at Jin (晉州, roughly modern Linfen, Shanxi) and Jiang (絳州, roughly modern Yuncheng, Shanxi) Prefectures.

However he died from illness, possibly poisoned by the Minister of Ceremonies Zheng Yuanshu (鄭元璹). Perpetrators were executed by Illig Qaghan.

Family 
He married the Sui dynasty's Princess Yicheng (義成公主) in heqin, the former wife of Qimin in levirate marriage along with other wives. Issues:

 Ashina Momo (阿史那摸末, 607 - 649) - was titled Yushe shad (郁射設) and married to someone of Imperial Li (李) clan.
 Ashina Wushi (阿史那勿施, d.683)
 Ashina Dachen (阿史那大臣)
 Ashina Yanchen (阿史那彦臣)
 Ashina Dichen (阿史那帝臣)
 Ashina Mingchen (阿史那名臣)
 Ashina Jianchen (阿史那諫臣)
 Ashina She'er (阿史那社爾, 609-655) - was titled To shad in youth and married to Princess Hengyang (衡陽公主), daughter of Gaozu.
 Ashina Daozhen (阿史那道真) - a general in Tang army.
Ashina Danai (阿史那大奈), later changed his name to Shi Danai (史大奈) - a general in Tang army.

References

Sources

Zongzheng, Xue (1992). "A History of Turks". Beijing: Chinese Social Sciences Press. . p. 208-213.

Year of birth missing
620 deaths
Göktürk khagans
Ashina house of the Turkic Empire
7th-century Turkic people